Velika Rudoka (Macedonian and) is the highest peak of the Rudoka Mountain, situated in the Šar Mountains range, exactly on the border between Kosovo and North Macedonia. With the altitude of 2,660 metres (8,727 feet), it is the highest mountain of Kosovo and also the highest mountain of Serbia according to the view held by the government of Serbia. In some older sources, the altitude was stated to be 2,658 metres, but newer measurements showed that the true altitude is 2 metres higher.

The Rudoka Mountain is situated between Šar Planina and Vrace, southwest of Tetovo. The mountain range lies in a southwest to northeasterly direction, neighbouring Borislavec. The eastern slopes are very steep. The western slopes lightly descend into Šar Planina. Few waters are present on the mountain and there are few valleys. Two lakes are on Rudoka: Crno jezero (Black lake) and Belo jezero (White lake). The Mazdrača, a stream which flows into the Vardar, has its source in Crno jezero. 

This was stated even in the 2020 Statistical Yearbook of Serbia, and some Serbian schoolbooks. The 2021 edition of the Statistical Yearbook of Serbia corrected the info, naming Velika Rudoka the highest peak, as did the 2021 edition of the Geography schoolbook for Serbian elementary schools. The 2021 edition of the Statistical Yearbook of Kosovo still states that Gjeravica is the highest mountain.

It has been known that Velika Rudoka is the higher of the two mountains since at least 1972, when the Topographical Map of Yugoslavia was published. According to Sava Stanković, PhD, the misconception started because of unclear boundaries between the Socialist Republic of Macedonia and the Socialist Republic of Serbia. The border was conclusively determined only after the breakup of Yugoslavia by a treaty between the Federal Republic of Yugoslavia and the Republic of Macedonia signed in Skopje on 23 February 2001.

Notes

References

External links

 Velika Rudoka on countryhighpoints.com
 Velika Rudoka on hikr.org 

Mountains of Kosovo
Mountains of Serbia
Two-thousanders of Kosovo
Two-thousanders of Serbia
Highest points of countries
Šar Mountains